Mitchell Harry Cohen (September 11, 1904 – January 7, 1991) was a United States district judge of the United States District Court for the District of New Jersey.

Education and career

Born in Philadelphia, Pennsylvania, Cohen received a Bachelor of Laws from Dickinson School of Law (now Penn State Dickinson Law) in 1928. He was in private practice in Camden, New Jersey from 1930 to 1958. He was also an annual solicitor for the Camden City Welfare Board in 1936, a Camden city prosecutor from 1936 to 1942, a member of the Camden County Board of Chosen Freeholders in 1940, and a Judge of the Camden City Municipal Court from 1942 to 1947. He served in the United States Army during World War II, and was thereafter prosecutor for Camden County, New Jersey from 1948 to 1958. Cohen was a Judge of the Camden County Court from 1958 to 1961, and of the New Jersey Superior Court from 1961 to 1962.

Federal judicial service

On July 6, 1962, Cohen was nominated by President John F. Kennedy to a seat on the United States District Court for the District of New Jersey vacated by Judge Richard Hartshorne. Cohen was confirmed by the United States Senate on August 1, 1962, and received his commission on August 2, 1962. He served as Chief Judge from 1973 to 1974, assuming senior status on September 11, 1974. Cohen served in that capacity until his death, on January 7, 1991, in Philadelphia.

Honor

The Mitchell H. Cohen United States Courthouse in Camden was dedicated in 1994.

References

Sources
 

1904 births
1991 deaths
Dickinson School of Law alumni
Judges of the United States District Court for the District of New Jersey
United States district court judges appointed by John F. Kennedy
Lawyers from Philadelphia
United States Army soldiers
United States Army personnel of World War II
20th-century American lawyers
20th-century American judges